Michele Bon (born 22 November 1972) is an Italian football manager who last time was manager of Moldovan club FC Zimbru Chișinău in Moldovan Super League.

In late November 2021, Bon was appointed as manager of Moldovan club FC Zimbru Chișinău, replacing Vlad Goian. Prior to this, Bon has worked as manager and assistant manager to a number of clubs from Romania and Hungary.

In June 2022 he was fired from Zimbru after 13 matches.

Bon speaks fluently a number of languages, including native Italian, English, Spanish, and Romanian.

Bon has UEFA PRO manager license and is alumni of Coverciano football school. A long time in his career, Bon has worked in Romania, or with Romanian managers in team.

Career
Managerial career
01/12/2021 > 12/07/2022	 Zimbru	Chișinău (manager)
06/08/2019 > 01/07/2020	 Miercurea Ciuc (assistant manager)
01/07/2018 > 01/07/2019	 FC Voluntari (assistant manager)
01/07/2017 > 01/07/2018	 Balmazújváros (assistant manager)
28/03/2016 > 01/07/2017	 South China T. D.
01/07/2015 > 01/01/2016	 Petrolul Ploiesti (assistant manager)
01/07/2013 > 01/07/2014	 Al Muharraq (assistant manager)
01/07/2012 > 01/07/2013	 Al Nasr Dubai (assistant manager)
30/11/2011 > 18/03/2012	 Târgu Mureș (fitness coach)
01/07/2008 > 30/11/2011	 Steaua Bucharest (FCSB) (fitness coach)

References

External links
 
 

1972 births
Living people
Italian football managers
FC Zimbru Chișinău managers
Moldovan Super Liga managers
Italian expatriate football managers
Expatriate football managers in Moldova
Italian expatriate sportspeople in Moldova